The Harvey School is a co-educational, college preparatory school near Katonah, New York, for students in grades 6 through 12. It is located on a wooded, 125-acre campus and has an annual budget (2015) of $14 million. AP courses in biology, American history, calculus, statistics, chemistry, physics, English, European history, and macroeconomics are available. Technology is integrated throughout the curriculum, and three Internet-accessible labs are available for student use. Basketball, cross-country, dance, football, ice hockey, rugby, lacrosse, and soccer are among the sports offered at Harvey. An optional five-day residential program is available for students in grades 8 through 12.

History 
The Harvey School was founded in 1916 in Hawthorne, New York by Dr. Herbert Carter as a residential school for boys, enrolling students through the secondary grades. Dr. Carter, a New York City pediatrician, built the school on his farm with the intention of providing a country environment and an educational program for his physically handicapped son, Herbert Swift Carter, Jr. He named the school for Sir William Harvey (1578–1657), personal physician of King Charles I who is considered one of the fathers of modern medical science.

John L. Miner was appointed as the school's first headmaster when its doors opened in October 1916, with an enrollment of twelve boys. Mr. Miner served the school for ten years before leaving to establish Greenwich Country Day School, originally known as The Harvey School of Greenwich.

Herbert Carter, Jr. graduated from Harvey in 1919, and from Princeton University in 1923. Following a year at Oxford he returned to Harvey to teach English. In 1926, he succeeded Mr. Miner as headmaster, serving in that position until 1938. After Dr. Carter's death 1927, the school shifted its purpose from caring for the physically handicapped to preparing boys from grades four through eight for enrollment in the leading eastern secondary boarding schools. In 1938, the school came under the leadership of Mr. Leverett T. Smith, who served until 1963.

In 1947 the school established a Board of Trustees and became a not-for-profit organization.

In 1959, the school lost its Hawthorne campus due to construction of a cloverleaf highway interchange on the Taconic and Sprain Parkways, and moved to its current  campus on the former Sylvan Weil Estate in Katonah. The new campus could accommodate 60 boarding students and a growing day student population. When Harry A. Dawe became headmaster in 1969 the school began a transition to being primarily a day school, while retaining the residential environment.

In 1970 the school added ninth grade, and between 1979 and 1981 it added grades nine through twelve. Harvey began admitting girls as day students when it began operating as a full high school. The fourth and fifth grades were eliminated in 1983 and 1984, and girls were admitted to the middle school beginning in 1984.

Barry Fenstermacher, served the school as headmaster from 1986 through 2016. During his tenure, in March 2005 a new arts center was completed to provide an environment for studio, music and dramatic-arts education, as well as a flexible performance theater. The architecture of the $6m theatre gained a silver prize for its design.

The current head of school, William J. Knauer joined in July, 2016.

Students and The School

Student government 
The Student Council meets regularly to discuss improvements in school life and to plan all-school activities such as Family Weekend and holiday parties. The President and Vice-President, elected by a simple majority of students during the preceding year, lead the Student Council. Additional representatives are elected by individual classes. The current President is Senior Halima Konteh.

Athletic teams 

+ V=Varsity, JV=Junior Varsity, MS=Middle School

The school's teams are quite successful in their leagues. In the last four years the Varsity Girls basketball has won the league three times as well as placing first and second in various tournaments. The Girls Varsity Soccer Team is relatively new, but has quickly climbed the ranks and won the HVAL Championship in 2007.

 2nd place HVAL 2005
 1st place HVAL 06
 NEPSAC Tournament Quarterfinalist 2006
 1st place HVAL 07
 NESPAC Tournament Quarterfinalist 2007

The boys' teams' standings all vary depending on the sport. Although not always on top, the football team participates in a very competitive league. The rugby team is unique among independent schools in the area. The Coach, Phil Lazzaro, holds practices throughout the year and even has a team trip to play in Ireland every three years.

Clubs and activities 
 The Rambler 
 Avatar
 Community Service Club
 Drama Club
 Environmental Awareness Club
 Japanese Club
 Equestrian Club
 Model United Nations
 Student Ambassadors (Tour Guides)
 Student Government
 Ultimate Frisbee Club 
 Accapella Club
 Improv Club
 Fantasy Sports Club
 The Cavalier
 The Pulse
 Stress Reduction through Coloring
 Young Republicans Club
 Gym Games
 Culinary Club
 Photo Club
 Outdoor Sports Club
 Spanish Club
 Jewish Heritage Club
 Film Club
 Chinese Culture Club
 Diversity Club
 Human Rights Club
 The Big Question Club
 Leadership Club
 Debate Club
 Dungeons and Dragons Club
 GSA
 Harvey Comedy Radio Club

Curriculum

Graduation requirements and course credits 
Upper School students are expected to have 60 credits upon graduation – the equivalent of 20 full-year courses plus four trimesters of physical education, fulfilled by participating in a team sport. The following distribution of academic requirements must be met for graduation:

 Four years of English
 Three years of Mathematics: Algebra 1, Geometry and Algebra 2
 Three years of Science: Trajectories (9th grade), two other science courses
 Three years of History: Global Studies, Western Civilization, and American History
 One year (three trimesters) of fine arts.
 Two Years of a Foreign Language (Excludes International Students)
 Senior Bridge Seminar

Course of study 
The Middle School offers a supportive environment that prepares students for the Upper School curriculum. Teachers enjoy a ratio of approximately one teacher to eight students so that they can support intellectual development by presenting an integrated course of study that focuses on key content areas. Students are encouraged to develop strategies and skills related to questioning, critical thinking and problem-solving. This type of instruction supports the mission of the school by recognizing the varying abilities of students, celebrating their learning styles and supporting the natural strengths of all individuals. The development of study skills is an integral part of the Middle School's curriculum. Sixth-grade students focus primarily on organization-related, time management, and note-taking strategies. Seventh-grade students work on improving their reading-for-meaning skills, note-taking strategies, and developing an understanding of the five-paragraph essay. Finally, in eighth grade, students focus on critical thinking, mastering the five-paragraph essay, and the development of a research paper.

A typical Middle School program includes the following:

A typical Upper School program includes the following:

References

External links 
Harvey School website
Private School Review

Preparatory schools in New York (state)
Boarding schools in New York (state)
Educational institutions established in 1916
Private high schools in Westchester County, New York
Private middle schools in Westchester County, New York
1916 establishments in New York (state)